Tombolo is a  (municipality) in the Province of Padua in the Italian region Veneto, located about  northwest of Venice and about  north of Padua.

Tombolo borders the following municipalities: Cittadella, Galliera Veneta, San Giorgio in Bosco, San Martino di Lupari, and Villa del Conte. Its  of Onara was the seat of the Ezzelini family of Italian medieval lords until 1199; it is also home to a marshy landscape now preserved by a regional park.

References

External links
 Official website

Cities and towns in Veneto